Elizabeth is a village in Allen Parish, Louisiana, United States with population of 417 in the 2020 census. It was a town and had population of 532 at the 2010 census.

History
As the village's website notes, the Village of Elizabeth was once known as the "Town of Elizabeth".  It became a town legally on January 23, 1964, when Gov. Jimmie H. Davis signed a proclamation making Elizabeth the fifth incorporated town in Allen Parish.

"The name Elizabeth was chosen as a tribute to the daughter of Sam Parks, one of the men who established the Calcasieu Paper Mill. Elizabeth was carefully planned and held the component of a town built to feed the lumber mill and made every effort to making them superior.  The Town hospital for the mill, now holds Elizabeth's Village Hall."

Geography

Demographics

As of the 2020 census, Elizabeth was noted as a Village, and it had population of 417.

As of the census of 2000, there were 574 people, 191 households, and 165 families residing in the town. The racial makeup of the town was 90.07% White, 4.36% African American, 1.22% Native American, 1.22% from other races, and 3.14% from two or more races. Hispanic or Latino of any race were 2.79% of the population. Elizabeth's closest neighbor in Allen Parish is Oakdale, LA. Oakdale is located to the east of Elizabeth.

There were 191 households, out of which 47.1% had children under the age of 18 living with them, 61.8% were married couples living together, 22.0% had a female householder with no husband present, and 13.6% were non-families. 11.0% of all households were made up of individuals, and 5.8% had someone living alone who was 65 years of age or older. The average household size was 3.01 and the average family size was 3.17.

In the town, the population was spread out, with 32.2% under the age of 18, 9.8% from 18 to 24, 26.8% from 25 to 44, 19.2% from 45 to 64, and 12.0% who were 65 years of age or older. The median age was 30 years. For every 100 females, there were 82.2 males. For every 100 females age 18 and over, there were 86.1 males.

The median income for a household in the town was $28,750, and the median income for a family was $30,375. Males had a median income of $30,000 versus $21,250 for females. The per capita income for the town was $10,259. About 14.8% of families and 15.5% of the population were below the poverty line, including 20.3% of those under age 18 and 3.3% of those age 65 or over.

Notable people

Faye Emerson, known in the early 1950s as the "First Lady of Television", was born in Elizabeth in 1917 and died in Majorca in 1983.

References

Villages in Louisiana
Villages in Allen Parish, Louisiana